Saturday's Voyeur is an annual musical satire formerly produced by Salt Lake Acting Company (SLAC) in Salt Lake City, Utah, United States. Each year a new show is written to parody contemporary life, politics, and religion in Utah. Saturday's Voyeur was created in 1978 by Michael Buttars & Nancy Borgenicht. In 1990, Allen Nevins joined the team writing team, and continued to co-write the show each year with Borgenicht. The pair opted to take Saturday's Voyeur from Salt Lake Acting Company in 1992 and 1993, but then returned to Salt Lake Acting Company the following year, where it remained until 2019.

The name Saturday's Voyeur is itself a parody of the production Saturday's Warrior, by Lex de Azevedo. With the Church of Jesus Christ of Latter-day Saints being prevalent in Utah culture it often becomes a dominant topic in the annual production. Poking fun at the doctrine, customs, and church figures of the religion through musical satire is used as comic relief for church members and non-members alike.

In July 2020, Salt Lake Acting Company announced it would no longer produce Saturday's Voyeur. Borgenicht and Nevins retain the rights to the property.

Productions

Eliot Hall at Salt Lake First Unitarian Church
 1977:  Saturday's Voyeur

Glass Factory Theatre
 1978: Roadshow '78
 1979: Roadshow '79
 1980: (name?)

Marmalade Hill Center
 1982: (name?)

Salt Lake Acting Company
 1987: 10th Anniversary Roadshow
 1988: Christmas Roadshow '88
 1989: Christmas Roadshow '89
 1990: Summer Roadshow

Green Street at Trolley Square
 1992: (name?)
 1993: (name?)

Salt Lake Acting Company
 1995: Spirit of the Hive
 1996: Phatman of the Opera
 1997: Jordan Riverdance
 1998: 20th Anniversary Cruise
 1999: The Zoodoo Voodoo Follies
 2000:  Saturday's Voyeur 2000
 2001: Mahana You Ugly
 2002: The Sorghum Chronicles
 2003: Saturday's Voyeur 25th Anniversary
 2004: Saturday's Voyeur 2004
 2005: Saturday's Voyeur 2005
 2006: Bendover, a Tale of Two Cities
 2007: The Rocky show
 2008:
 2009:
 2010: The Year That Was
 2011: The Wackos are Coming!
 2013:
 2014:
 2015:
 2016:
 2017: The Sh*t Show
 2018: Saturday's Voyeur 40th Anniversary
 2019: Dark Light

References
 
 
 
 
 In This Week SLC http://www.inthisweek.com/view.php?id=2421562 
 The Salt Lake Tribune https://web.archive.org/web/20110707054549/http://www.sltrib.com/sltrib/home/49833258-76/voyeur-saturday-utah-lake.html.csp
 Deseret News (Salt Lake City), 'Voyeur' full of talent, but offensive, 24 Jun 2003

External links
 Official website of the Salt Lake Acting Company

Events in Utah
Latter Day Saint plays and pageants
Latter Day Saint movement in Utah
1977 musicals